The women's 10 metre platform competition of the diving events at the 2015 Pan American Games was held between the 10 and 11 of July at the CIBC Pan Am/Parapan Am Aquatics Centre and Field House in Toronto, Canada. The winner of the competition qualified his country a quota place for the 2016 Summer Olympics in Rio de Janeiro, Brazil. If the host nation of the Olympics wins the event, the runner up will qualify instead.

The individual diving competitions all consist of two rounds. In the first, the divers each perform five dives. All divers advance to the finals. In the final round, the divers perform a final set of five dives, with the scores from those dives (and only those dives) used to determine final ranking.

Seven judges evaluate each dive, giving the diver a score between 0 and 10 with increments of 0.5; scores below 7.0 or above 9.5 are rare. The two highest and two lowest scores from each judge are dropped. The remaining three scores are summed, and multiplied by the degree of difficulty of the dive to give the total score for the dive. Scores from each dive in the round are summed to give the round score.

Schedule

Results
Green denotes finalists

References 

Diving at the 2015 Pan American Games